The 1983–84 Israel State Cup (Gvia HaMedina) was the 45th season of Israel's nationwide football cup competition and the 30th after the Israeli Declaration of Independence.

The competition was won by Hapoel Lod who have beaten Hapoel Be'er Sheva 3–2 on penalties after 0–0 in the final.

Results

Fifth Round

Sixth Round

Seventh Round

Round of 16

Quarter-finals

Semi-finals

Final

References
100 Years of Football 1906-2006, Elisha Shohat (Israel), 2006, pp. 262-3
Ramat HaShikma (Liga Bet) eliminated Lazarus Holon in the State Cup Davar, 18.12.1983, Historical Jewish Press 
Cup (Pages 2-3) Hadshot HaSport, 1.1.1984, archive.football.co.il 
Hapoel Ashkelon - Hapoel Ramla 1:0 (Page 3) Hadshot HaSport, 4.1.1984, archive.football.co.il 
Hapoel Jerusalem - Tzafririm Holon 7:2 (Page 4) Hadshot HaSport, 5.1.1984, archive.football.co.il 
Cup (Pages 2-6) Hadshot HaSport, 15.1.1984, archive.football.co.il 
Maccabi Jaffa - Hapoel Hadera 3:1 (Page 2) Hadshot HaSport, 18.1.1984, archive.football.co.il 

Israel State Cup
State Cup
Israel State Cup seasons